The International Agreement on the Neutrality of Laos is an international agreement signed in Geneva on July 23, 1962 between 14 states, including Laos, as a result of the International Conference on the Settlement of the Laotian Question, which lasted from May 16, 1961 to July 23, 1962.

Union of Burma, Cambodia, Canada, the People's Republic of China, the Democratic Republic of Vietnam, France, India, Polish People's Republic, the Republic of Vietnam, Thailand, the Soviet Union, the United Kingdom, and the United States signed the declaration. It and the statement of neutrality by the Royal Government of Laos of July 9, 1962 came into force as an international agreement on July 23, the date of signature.

Background 

After a brief occupation of Laos by the Japanese at the end of World War II and a declaration of independence by Laotian nationalists, the French reoccupied Laos and the rest of French Indochina, which included Vietnam and Cambodia. In the following insurgency, the Indochinese communists formed the Pathet Lao, a Laotian nationalist movement and a Vietnamese ally in the struggle against France. After the French defeat, the Geneva Accords of 1954 established Laos sovereignty. In 1960, civil war broke out between the Royal Lao Army, supported by the United States, against the Pathet Lao insurgents, supported by the communists in North Vietnam.

Agreements
John F. Kennedy proposed a negotiated settlement with the Soviet Union and other interested parties. In 1962, a peace conference in Geneva produced a Declaration on the Neutrality of Laos and a three-part coalition government of pro-American, pro-communist, and neutralist factions.

The 14 signatories pledged to respect Laotian neutrality and to refrain from direct or indirect interference in the internal affairs of Laos, drawing Laos into military alliances, or establishing military bases in Laotian territory. The Laotian government pledged to promulgate constitutionally its commitments, which would have the force of law.

Aftermath
However, the agreement was contravened almost immediately by the United States, the Soviet Union, the People's Republic of China, North Vietnam, and the Pathet Lao themselves. North Vietnam continued to garrison 7000 soldiers in Laos. The Soviet Union and the People's Republic of China provided military support to the Pathet Lao. The United States started a bombing campaign that supported both the Royal Laotian Government and American efforts in South Vietnam. The Pathet Lao continued to attack and to harass the neutralist forces. 

The violations exemplified the conduct of all of the parties for the remainder of the Second Indochina War.

In 1959, North Vietnam had already established a supply line through "neutral" Laotian territory to supply the Viet Cong insurgency against South Vietnam. The communists called the supply line the "Trường Sơn Strategic Supply Route (Đường Trường Sơn)." The Pathet Lao and the North Vietnamese continued to use and to improve the supply route, which would become known as the  Ho Chi Minh Trail. 

More specifically, during the Second Indochina War, the North Vietnamese obtained the co-operation of the Pathet Lao to construct and maintain the Ho Chi Minh Trail, which passed throughout the length of Laos. Thousands of Vietnamese troops were stationed in Laos to maintain the road network and to provide for its security. Vietnamese military personnel also fought beside the Pathet Lao in its struggle to overthrow the neutralist government of Laos. The co-operation persisted after the war and the communist victory in Laos.

References

External links
 Declaration on the Neutrality of Laos. Signed at Geneva, on 23 July 1962

1962 in Laos
Treaties concluded in 1962
Treaties entered into force in 1962
Treaties of the Kingdom of Laos
Treaties of the Soviet Union
Treaties of Myanmar
Treaties of the Kingdom of Cambodia (1953–1970)
Treaties of Canada
Treaties of the People's Republic of China
Treaties of Thailand
Treaties of the United Kingdom
Treaties of the United States
Treaties of France
Treaties of the Polish People's Republic
Treaties of North Vietnam
Treaties of South Vietnam
Treaties of India
Laos–United States relations